This is a list of monuments in Birkirkara, Malta, which are listed on the National Inventory of the Cultural Property of the Maltese Islands. The list includes graded scheduled properties from the Malta Scheduled Property Register maintained by Malta's Planning Authority. The latter are denoted by an ID beginning with the letters MSPR.

List  

|}

References

Birkirkara
Birkirkara